Founded in 2006, Bookatable is an online restaurant reservation service headquartered in London, United Kingdom.

Bookatable provides real-time reservation services for 13,000 restaurants across 12 countries. Diners can also make bookings via Bookatable's consumer-facing websites.

In January 2016, Michelin announced that they had acquired Bookatable, with the intention of accelerating its development in the online restaurant reservation market in Europe.

In December 2019, Michelin sold the company to TripAdvisor as part of a "Strategic partnership" between the two companies.

Services

For restaurant customers

Restaurants use Bookatable's reservation calendar technology to take table bookings electronically on their own websites. Bookatable also provides restaurant marketing, database management and technical support.

Restaurants using Bookatable's reservation technology include The Ritz, PizzaExpress, T.G.I. Friday’s, Hakkasan, Prezzo, Nobu, OXO Tower, and Beefeater Grill.

For diners

Users can make real-time reservations via Bookatable's consumer facing websites.

Using Bookatable's Android and iOS apps, diners can view its directory of restaurants, and make bookings directly through the app.

Acquisitions

2Book, a Swedish-based reservations service, was acquired in 2014.

Funding

As of May 2012, Bookatable has raised $62m from investors which include Balderton Capital, Wellington Partners and Ekstranda.

Partners

Bookatable provides a restaurant booking engine for Michelin, Tripadvisor, Relais & Chateaux, Zomato, Eniro, Time Out, tastecard, and Square Meal.

Markets

Bookatable operates in 12 countries across Europe and America.

See also 
 List of websites about food and drink

References

External links 
 Bookatable.co.uk

Online food ordering